Bowman Municipal Airport  is a public airport located two miles (3 km) west of the central business district of Bowman, a city in Bowman County, North Dakota, United States. It is owned by the Bowman County Airport Authority.

Although most U.S. airports use the same three-letter location identifier for the FAA and IATA, Bowman Municipal Airport is assigned BPP by the FAA and BWM by the IATA.

Facilities and aircraft 
For the 12-month period ending July 31, 2007, the airport had 3,620 aircraft operations: 88% general aviation, 11% air taxi, and 1% military.

References

External links 

Defunct airports in the United States
Airports in North Dakota
Buildings and structures in Bowman County, North Dakota
Transportation in Bowman County, North Dakota